Waltham Public Schools is a school district headquartered in Waltham, Massachusetts.

In 1999 the school system stated that it wanted to correct a "racial imbalance" in its school system, which goes against the racial imbalance state laws, so it drafted a $101 million school construction program and requested that the state government pay 90% of the costs of constructing new schools.

Schools
High schools
 Waltham High School
Middle schools
 Kennedy Middle School
 McDevitt Middle School
Elementary schools
Fitzgerald Elementary School
MacArthur Elementary School
Northeast Elementary School
Plympton Elementary School
Stanley Elementary School
Whittemore Elementary School

References

External links
 Waltham Public Schools

Waltham, Massachusetts
School districts in Massachusetts
Education in Middlesex County, Massachusetts